Oʻnhayot or Oʻnxayat ( or) is an urban-type settlement in Namangan Region, Uzbekistan. It is part of Uychi District. The town population in 2005 was 14,000 people.

References

Populated places in Namangan Region
Urban-type settlements in Uzbekistan